Gold mining in the People's Republic of China has made that country the world's largest gold producer. South Africa had until then been the largest for 101 years straight since 1905. The major reasons for this change in position had been due to South African production falling by 50% in the past decade as production costs there have risen, more stringent safety regulations have been implemented, and existing mines have become depleted.

On the other hand, as of 2014 gold output in China had more than doubled since year 2000. In recent years, China's gold mining industry has received increased foreign and domestic investment, and project numbers have increased as more discoveries have been found.  China produced nearly 300 tonnes of gold in 2008. It is also the only country in the top three where production rose in 2008. In 2014, production had increased to 450 tonnes and it was expected to reach 490 in 2015. The second-largest producer, Australia, mined 274 tonnes in the same year, followed by Russia with 247 tonnes. South Africa is now in the 6th position with 152 tonnes.

Important organizations include China Gold Association (中国黄金协会) and China International Mining Group (中国国际矿业集团).

Scale 

Domestic producers still suffer from a lack of scale. In 2000, there were about 2,000 gold producers - most of them relatively small and unsophisticated by international standards.  Few are able to operate on a global platform, though the number of producers had shrunk to about 800 in 2007 after mergers and acquisitions and restructuring and consolidation. Most of these firms' technological standards and management are weak and inefficient.

The country's oldest and largest gold producer is the China National Gold Group Corporation (CNGGC), which accounts for 20% of total gold production in China and controls more than 30% of domestic reserves. CNGGC also controls Zhongji Gold, the first publicly listed gold mining company in China.

Production and reserves 
China's gold reserves are relatively small (about 7% of the world total). Production has usually been concentrated in the eastern provinces of Shandong, Henan, Fujian and Liaoning. Recently, western provinces such as Guizhou and Yunnan have seen a sharp increase, but from a relatively small base. There is gold mining in Tibet in Maizhokunggar County east of Lhasa.

Foreign investment 
Top foreign investment has come from Canada and Australia. Though foreign investment still constitutes a very important part of gold mining expansion, since 1995 it has no longer been actively encouraged by the Chinese government.

Vancouver-based Jinshan Gold Mines Inc. started production in July at its Chang Shan Hao gold mine in China's northern province of Inner Mongolia, reaching 19,000 ounces of gold by December 18. The mine is designed to produce about 120,000 ounces of gold per year, making it one of the country's largest producers.

Multibillion-dollar Indian Liberty Group owns two mines in China, and is scheduled to start mining in 2012

Gold Fields and Australia's Sino Gold Mining Ltd., have set up a joint venture focused on discovering large gold deposits in China with the potential to produce about 500,000 ounces a year. Sino Gold has been buying stakes in Chinese gold deposits and explorers. In May it started production at its Jinfeng Gold Mine in southern China, with planned gold production of 180,000 ounces per year.

Demand and consumption 
Most of China's gold output stays in the country where it is transformed into jewelry and manufactured items, though the country's export role is increasing. In 2007, fabrication rose 18%, helped by demand from China's increasingly wealthy middle and upper classes. With a rapid rise in domestic demand, China is now the world's fourth largest gold-consuming country. Chinese market demand accounts for 9.2% of worldwide gold consumption.

Investment in foreign mines 
In 2006 the Chinese Government began encouraging some private and state-owned companies to pursue mining deals outside of China. In the 10 years that have since passed, the number of major mining/mineral projects in Africa that are owned by Chinese firms have increased from only a handful in 2006 to more than 120 in 2015. A 2016 report stated that Chinese mining companies intend to continue and even increase investments in foreign assets.  
In 2012, the China General Nuclear Power Corporation (CGNPC) invested in the Husab project in Namibia, one of the world’s largest uranium deposits, and mining started in 2015. Chinese mining companies have invested and purchased assets in Sierra Leone, at least nine mining companies in South Africa, Zimbabwe, and the Democratic Republic of Congo (DRC).

Futures market 
In January 2008, China opened its first gold futures market in Shanghai in response to domestic demand for gold, as well as allowing its producers to hedge risks from daily gold price fluctuations.

See also 

Gold extraction
World Gold Council
Xie Xuejing
Gold mining in the United States
China Non-Ferrous Metal Mining

Notes 
One metric ton is equal to about 1.1 short tons, which is the common volume measure in the United States, or 35,274 ounces.

References

External links
Beijing Gold Economy Development Research Center
Gold Mining In China: Taming The Wild West A report from U.S. Embassy China May 1996

 
Industry in China